Katar may refer to:

 Katar, India, Karnataka
 Katar, Bhojpur, Bihar
 Katar (dagger)

See also
 Qatar (disambiguation)